Kjerstin Andersen (born 23 November 1958) is a former Norwegian team handball goalkeeper and Olympic medalist. She won a silver medal at the 1988 Summer Olympics in Seoul with the Norwegian national team. Kjerstin Andersen played 104 games for the national team during her career.

References

External links

1958 births
Living people
Norwegian female handball players
Olympic silver medalists for Norway
Olympic medalists in handball
Medalists at the 1988 Summer Olympics
Handball players at the 1988 Summer Olympics